The Blue Castle is a 1926 novel by Canadian author Lucy Maud Montgomery, best known for her novel Anne of Green Gables (1908).

The story is set during the 1920s in the fictional town of Deerwood, located in the Muskoka region of Ontario, Canada. Deerwood is based on Bala, Ontario, which Montgomery visited in 1922. Maps of the two towns show similarities.

This novel is considered one of L.M. Montgomery's few adult works of fiction, along with A Tangled Web, and is the only book she wrote that is entirely set outside of Prince Edward Island. It has grown in popularity since being republished in 1990. The book was adapted for the stage twice; in 1982 it was made into a successful Polish musical, and ten years later Canadian playwright Hank Stinson authored another version, The Blue Castle: A Musical Love Story.

Colleen McCullough, author of The Thorn Birds, evidently used The Blue Castle as the basis of her novel The Ladies of Missalonghi—subconsciously, as she alleged—to the point of provoking accusations of plagiarism.

Plot summary

Valancy Stirling is twenty-nine, unmarried (and thus considered an "old maid"), and has lived her entire life with her nagging mother and gossip-minded extended family who actively discourage happiness and treat Valancy like a child. She retreats from her unhappy circumstances with flights of imaginative fantasy, centring on daydreams of her imaginary "Blue Castle," and finding refuge in the books of her favourite author, John Foster, who writes about the great beauty of nature. When Valancy is diagnosed with a terminal heart ailment, she hides it from her family and, at the same time, realizes she has never been happy in her life, so she rebels against the colourless life that her family has always imposed on her. She begins by judging them objectively and, even worse, telling them exactly what she thinks, causing the Stirling clan to conclude that Valancy has suddenly lost her mind.

Valancy decides to move out of her mother's house and take a position as a housekeeper for a friend of hers, Cissy Gay, who is now gravely ill. Cissy and Valancy had known each other as children, but Cissy became ostracized from society for having a child out of wedlock, as well as on account of her father, Roaring Abel, and his reckless, usually-drunken behaviour. Cissy and Valancy share a room and rebuild their friendship. Valancy enjoys being paid a salary and spending her money in ways her family would not approve, such as purchasing a brightly-coloured, low-necked dress. She also begins spending time with Barney Snaith, who visits often as a friend to Roaring Abel and Cissy, but who the townspeople are convinced is a criminal and/or the father of Cissy's illegitimate, now-deceased child.

Just before the end of her life, Cissy confides in Valancy about the man she fell in love with. He had offered to marry her when she told him she was pregnant, but she refused because she saw that he did not love her any more. Her baby compensated for her heartbreak, but when her baby died, she was devastated. Cissy eventually passes away, and Valancy's family expects her to move back home, having magnanimously decided to forgive her recent behaviour. They are momentarily appeased when Valancy agrees that she will not stay with Roaring Abel; however, she does not plan to move back home. Instead, she proposes to Barney, revealing that she is dying and wants to enjoy the remaining time she has left. She confesses that she has fallen in love with him but tells him that she does not expect him to feel the same. Barney agrees to marry her, and they have a quiet ceremony the next day. Valancy's family is horrified upon discovering that she has married such a disreputable man (although there is no real evidence to justify his reputation), and they effectively disown her.

Barney takes Valancy to his home on a wooded island, located on the lake Mistawis, which Valancy comes to see as being very much like the Blue Castle to which she used to escape in her imagination. Together they get along very well, though he forbids her from ever entering a certain room in the house: Bluebeard's Chamber. Barney and Valancy share wonderful conversations and take long walks on the island, and she often quotes to him from books by John Foster. They celebrate Christmas, and he gives her a necklace of pearl beads.

Just when the year she was given to live is almost over, Valancy gets her shoe stuck in a train track and is nearly killed by an oncoming train. Barney saves her in the nick of time, risking his own life to do so. After the shock passes, Valancy realizes that she should have died because the doctor had told her any sudden shock would kill her. Barney is likewise stunned by the experience because he realizes that he has come to love Valancy, who, he believes, must soon die from her heart condition. Instead of telling Valancy how he feels, he retreats to his beloved woods to think. Valancy assumes that he has left because, having married her out of pity, he now realizes he is trapped in a marriage he doesn't want. Valancy goes back to the doctor, who realizes that he sent Valancy a letter with a diagnosis meant for a Miss Sterling, not Stirling, who did have a fatal heart condition; Valancy's condition was never serious.

As she arrives home from the doctor, with Barney still away, she finds a gaudily dressed man waiting near their home. He introduces himself as Barney's father, Dr. Redfern, the millionaire who invented Redfern's Purple Pills and other patent medicines. Dr. Redfern explains that years ago, Barney left town abruptly without word to his father, who had no way of tracking him down until Barney withdrew $15,000 from his bank account to buy Valancy's necklace, alerting his father to his whereabouts. Barney's father wants him to come back to him, as Barney is the only family he has. Thinking that Barney believes she tricked him into marriage, Valancy decides to leave him and return to her mother's house so he can be free. While searching for a pencil to write Barney an explanatory note, she goes into his secret room and discovers that he is also John Foster, the author of her favourite books. She writes the note, explaining the mix-up behind her diagnosis and asking for a divorce, and leaves behind the necklace.

Valancy returns home and reveals to her family that Barney is a millionaire and the son of the famous Dr. Redfern, as well as the noted literary figure John Foster. Barney's millionaire status instantly erases any misgivings her family had about him, and they are determined that Barney and Valancy must stay together. Barney, upon finding Valancy's note, rushes to the house to see Valancy and asks her to come back. At first she refuses, believing that he is only asking her out of pity. When he becomes angry at her, thinking that she is refusing him because she is ashamed of his father's patent medicine business, she realizes he does really love her and agrees to come back to him. Barney tells Valancy how much he has grown to love her and explains that he truly wants to spend the rest of his life with her. The book closes with Valancy and Barney getting ready to leave on a global trip for further adventures while her "own Blue Castle," their home on Barney's small island, will be waiting for their return.

Characters 

 Valancy Jane Stirling (also referred to as "Doss" by her family)
 Barney Snaith (an alias of Bernard Snaith Redfern)
 Mrs. Frederick Stirling (Amelia), Valancy's mother
 Cousin Christine Stickles, a middle-aged family member who lives with Valancy and her mother
 Cousin Olive, a cousin Valancy's age who is considered the family favorite
 Cousin Georgiana
 Uncle Benjamin
 Aunt Alberta & Uncle Herbert 
 Aunt & Uncle Wellington
 Dr. Trent, the doctor who misdiagnoses Valancy
 Cecilia "Cissy" Gay, a childhood friend of Valancy's
 Roaring Abel Gay, Cissy Gay's unruly father
 Dr. Stalling, the reverend of the Stirlings' Anglican church
 Mr. Towers, the pastor of Valancy's Free Methodist church
 Edward Beck, an elderly widower who proposes marriage to Valancy
 Ethel Traverse, a woman Barney had previously been in love with
 Dr. Redfern, Barney's millionaire father

First Edition Notes
Almost all editions of The Blue Castle lack dust jackets. The true first edition does not have a castle on the front boards, it was added after Montgomery had commented, "Not so pretty. A plain cover."

See also

The Ladies of Missalonghi, similar novel by Colleen McCullough

References

Further reading

External links
 
 
 
 
 An L.M. Montgomery Resource Page Resource for all things L.M. Montgomery, includes The Blue Castle Encyclopedia and more on Valancy
 The Blue Castle: A Musical Love Story a 1997 musical adapted from the book by Hank Stinson
 L.M. Montgomery Online Formerly the L.M. Montgomery Research Group, this site includes a blog, extensive lists of primary and secondary materials, detailed information about Montgomery's publishing history, and a filmography of screen adaptations of Montgomery texts. See, in particular, the page about The Blue Castle.

1926 Canadian novels
Novels by Lucy Maud Montgomery
Novels set in Ontario
District Municipality of Muskoka
McClelland & Stewart books